Eucalybites is a genus of moths in the family Gracillariidae.

Species
Eucalybites aureola Kumata, 1982

External links
Global Taxonomic Database of Gracillariidae (Lepidoptera) 

Gracillariinae
Gracillarioidea genera